is a Japanese professional football club based in Sapporo, on the island of Hokkaido. They currently play in the J1 League, which is the top tier of football in the country.

Unlike other teams, their main home ground at Sapporo Dome is also used by the Hokkaido Nippon-Ham Fighters baseball team, so some home games are moved to Sapporo Atsubetsu Stadium.

Name origin
The club name of "Consadole" is made from consado, a reverse of the Japanese word  and the Spanish expression Ole.

History

Toshiba S.C. (1935–1995)
Consadole's club tradition dates back to 1935 when Toshiba Horikawa-cho Soccer Club was founded in Kawasaki, Kanagawa. They were promoted to the now-defunct Japan Soccer League Division 2 in 1978. They adopted new name Toshiba Soccer Club in 1980 and were promoted to the JSL Division 1 in 1989. Their highest placement, 4th in the 1990 and 1991 seasons. Relegating themselves as they were not ready for J.League implementation, they joined the newly formed Japan Football League in 1992 and played the last season as Toshiba S.C. in 1995.

They sought to be a professional club but the owner Toshiba did not regard Kawasaki as an ideal hometown. This was because Verdy Kawasaki, one of the most prominent clubs at that time, was also based in the city, which Toshiba apparently believed was not big enough to accommodate two clubs. (Verdy has since crossed the Tama River to be based in Chōfu City in the west of Tokyo and has been renamed as Tokyo Verdy 1969; the only remaining professional club is Kawasaki Frontale, originally part of Fujitsu.)

They decided to move to Sapporo where the local government and community had been keen to provide a base for a professional soccer team as they awaited Sapporo Dome to be completed in 2001. The ownership was transferred from Toshiba to Hokkaido Football Club plc. before the start of the 1996 season.

Toshiba does not have financial interest in the club any more but Consadole still boasts their forerunner's red and black colours on their uniform.

Consadole Sapporo (1996–2015)
Consadole Sapporo inherited the JFL status from Toshiba S.C.. Their debut season in 1996 was not overly successful as they finished 5th and missed promotion. However, they won the JFL championship in 1997 and were promoted to J.League.

In 1998, their first J.League season saw them finish 14th out of 18 but this did not guarantee them staying up. From the 1999 season, the J.League had 2 divisions and the play-offs involving five teams (four J.League sides and the champions of the JFL) were to be played. In order to decide who were involved in the play-offs, not only the results of the 1998 season but also those of the 1997 were taken account of. Consadole, who did not play in the previous season, was placed 14th in the aggregate standing and despite finishing above Gamba Osaka (who had finished 4th in 1997), was forced to face the play-offs. They lost all four games, two against Vissel Kobe, and another two against Avispa Fukuoka, and became the first-ever J.League side that experienced relegation.

In 1999, Takeshi Okada, the former Japan national team coach, was appointed as head coach in an effort to make an immediate comeback to J1, but this attempt failed as they finished 5th. Their heavy investment on players counted against them and, at this point, the debt owed by the club exceeded 3 billion yen (US$33 million). The bankruptcy looked a near-certainty.

In 2000, they cut costs dramatically. As a result, the team often included as many as eight on-loan players in the starting line-up. However, this strategy paid off and the club won the J2 championship as well as promotion to J1. The club posted a single-year profit for the first time in their history this year.

In 2001, they finished 11th in J1. However, at the end of the season, the club failed to persuade Okada to renew the contract and several leading players also left the club. In 2002, they finished bottom and were relegated to J2 for a second time.

In 2003, they again tried to return to the top-flight immediately by investing heavily but the team didn't perform well on the pitch. They finished 9th and their debt again crossed the 3 billion yen mark.

The deficit-ridden club realized they needed a drastic restructuring and released highly paid leading players including mainstay Yasuyuki Konno. The rejuvenated but inexperienced team finished bottom of J2 in 2004. The bright side was their improved financial situation where the debt was sharply reduced to less than 100 million yen.

In 2005 and 2006, they finished 6th. In 2006 they also reached the semi-finals of the Emperor's Cup, 15 years after reaching the semi-finals in Kawasaki–the furthest they've reached in the Cup. In 2007 they finally earned promotion as champions and play in J1 in the 2008 season.

A loss on October 19, 2008 confirmed Sapporo's relegation to J2 for the 2009 season, overtaking Kyoto Sanga as the league's most relegated side. Having won the Japanese second-tier championship a record 5 times (including two JSL Second Divisions as Toshiba, and one former JFL title), they were promoted to Division One after finishing third in 2011. However, a torrid 2012 season ended with Consadole holding the highest goals conceded per game ratio, the worst points per game ratio and the highest loss percentage in J.League history as they were relegated after just 27 matches played, making the 2012 team one of the worst to have ever featured in the top division.　From the 2016 season, the club has adopted the new name as "Hokkaido Consadole Sapporo".

Hokkaido Consadole Sapporo (2016–present)
In 2016, the club changed its name to Hokkaido Consadole Sapporo. After four years spent at the J2, Hokkaido Consadole Sapporo returned to the J1 ahead of the 2017 season, having been promoted as 2016 J2 League champions.

On Feb. 9, 2018, the team won the inaugural Pacific Rim Cup tournament in Honolulu, Hawaii, defeating the Vancouver Whitecaps 1–0. 2018 was the season they reached their highest placing in the J.League era and in Sapporo – 4th, 27 years after achieving the same place in Kawasaki.

In January 2022, Hokkaido Consadole Sapporo's Thai player Chanathip Songkrasin who was part of the 2018 J.League Best XI joined Kawasaki Frontale with a transfer fee of around $3.8 million, breaking the J.League record for the highest domestic transfer.

The club is currently playing their 7th consecutive season at the J1 on 2023.

Mascot 
Hokkaido Consadole Sapporo's mascot is Dole Kun, an anthropomorphic Shima Fukurou (or Blakiston's fish owl). The owl was chosen as not only was it on Consa's crest, but also because it is the largest owl in Japan, and it also lives in Hokkaido. He also enjoys having hot baths sometimes. He also is friends with Frep the Fox and Polly Polaris, the mascots of the Hokkaido Nippon-Ham Fighters, which can be attributed because the Fighters and Consa share the same stadium.

Record as J.League member

Key

Honours

League 
Japan Soccer League Division 2/Japan Football League/J.League Division 2/J2 League:
Champions (6): 1979, 1988–89, 1997, 2000, 2007, 2016

Cups 
All Japan Senior Football Championship:
Winners (1): 1977
JSL Cup:
Winners (1): 1981 (shared with Mitsubishi Motors)

Current players

Out on loan

 Past (and present) players who are the subjects of Wikipedia articles can be found here

Reserve squad (U-18s)

Coaching staff
For the 2023 season.

Managerial history

Kit evolution

Affiliated clubs
  Khon Kaen FC (March 2013−)
  Long An FC (March 2013−)
  Arema FC (June 2014−)
  Johor Darul Ta'zim (April 2016−)
  Sint-Truidense VV (April 2019−)
 Buriram United FC (June 2022−)

In popular culture
In the Captain Tsubasa manga series, two characters were from Hokkaido Consadole Sapporo, midfielder Hikaru Matsuyama (himself a Hokkaido native) and forward Kazumasa Oda. In 2017, Matsuyama became an Hokkaido Consadole Sapporo player, given a squad number, 36, and is also an official ambassador of the team from Hokkaido.

References

External links

  

 
J.League clubs
Japan Soccer League clubs
Association football clubs established in 1935
Toshiba
Japanese League Cup winners
1935 establishments in Japan
Japan Football League (1992–1998) clubs
Sports teams in Sapporo